Out and About is an album by American jazz trombonist Steve Swell featuring Roswell Rudd, which was recorded in 1996 and released on CIMP.

Reception

The Penguin Guide to Jazz notes that "Swell's tone has a raucous, overheated timbre when he warms up, and set beside Rudd's more constricted delivery, the results are more reminiscent of a couple of old Dixieland tailgaters going at it than anything 'avant-garde'."

Track listing
All compositions by Steve Swell
"Fruition" - 8:36
"Moves" - 7:45
"Out and About" - 11:16
"Start Up" - 9:01
"Walking the Dog" - 12:50
"A Painting" - 12:14
"Diesel Dots (for Ryan & Kelcey)" - 12:09

Personnel
Steve Swell - trombone
Roswell Rudd - trombone
Ken Filiano - bass
Lou Grassi - drums

References

1996 albums
Steve Swell albums
CIMP albums